Francesca Dotto (born March 17, 1993) is an Italian basketball player for Gesam Gas Lucca and the Italian national team.

She participated at the EuroBasket Women 2017.

References

1993 births
Living people
Italian women's basketball players
People from Camposampiero
Point guards
Basketball players at the 2010 Summer Youth Olympics
Sportspeople from the Province of Padua
21st-century Italian women